Top Model, Cycle 5 is the fifth cycle of an ongoing reality show based on Tyra Banks' America's Next Top Model that pits contestants from Poland against each other in a variety of competitions to determine who will win the title of the next Polish Top Model.

Joanna Krupa, who also serves as the lead judge, returned to host the fifth cycle. Other judges included fashion designer Dawid Woliński, fashion show director Kasia Sokołowska and photographer Marcin Tyszka. This is the second season of the show to feature male contestants in the cast after cycle 4. Among the prizes for the season were a contract with Avant Models, an appearance on the cover of the Polish issue of Glamour and 100,000 złotys (US$30,000).

The international destinations for this cycle are Tel Aviv, Ho Chi Minh City, Cần Thơ and Lanzarote. The season began airing on September 7, 2015. The winner of the competition was a 19-year-old Radek Pestka, from Gdynia.

Auditions
The auditions for season five took place from June 13 to June 18, 2015, in the cities of Gdańsk, Katowice and Warsaw.

Contestants
(ages stated are at start of contest)

Episodes

Episode 1
Original aridate: 

Auditions for the fifth season of Poland's Next Top Model begin, and aspiring hopefuls are chosen for the semi-final round.

Episode 2
Original airdate: 

In the semi-finals, the judges begin to eliminate contestants to narrow the number of models who will battle it out for a place in the final fourteen.

Episode 3
Original airdate: 

In the third and final casting episode of the season, the judges choose the finalists who will move onto the main competition out of the remaining pool of contestants.

Names in bold represent eliminated semi-finalists

Episode 4
Original airdate: 

One by one, the chosen fourteen finalists move into the top model house. Some are displeased to find that contestants they dislike have been put through to the final cast. The following day the models receive their makeovers, causing displeasure among several of the girls who fear that their hair will be cut short. Jagoda openly complains about her new hair color, believing it doesn't suit her look. For the first photo shoot of the competition the models are divided based on gender to shoot two separate covers for Glamour magazine, getting to pose with last season's top two - Michal and Osi. Back at the house, Michael, Karolina G, and Magda begin speculating on who will be eliminated at the first round of judging.

For the official photo shoot of the week the contestants meet Miss Polonia 2011, Marcelina Zawadzka and photographer Jacek Kolodziejski for a session with parachutes. Before getting styled, each contestant is flown on a plane to take turns skydiving. Andre, Jakob, Karolina P, Ola and Radek are all standouts on set. Natalia is critiqued for bringing little energy on set, while Justyna and Kamila struggle.

At panel Joanna reveals that mentor  Michał Pirog will be given the opportunity to bring one eliminated contestant back into the competition immediately after their elimination whenever he chooses. Jakob is deemed to have taken the best photo during the shoot, with Justyna and Kamila being placed in the bottom two for their lackluster photos. In spite of having expressed her desire to leave, Joanna hands the last photo to Kamila, and Justyna becomes the first finalist to be eliminated.

First call-out: Jakob Kosel 
Bottom two: Justyna Łopian & Kamila Ibrom
Eliminated: Justyna Łopian
Featured photographers: Zuza Krajewska (Glamour shoot) Jacek Kolodziejski (Parachute shoot)
Special guests: Łukasz Urbański, Michał Baryza, Osi Ugonoh
Guest judge: Marcelina Zawadzka

Episode 5
Original airdate: 

The remaining thirteen contestants receive a runway lesson from judge Kasia Sokołowska before being put to their paces in their very first runway show. At the venue they are introduced to model Zo Nowak, who shares tips based on her experience. Backstage, Samuel refuses to wear a snake print jacket due to his religious convictions, explaining that snake print was a 'symbol of evil'. After threatening to drop out of the competition, he is given a new outfit - much to the annoyance of several of the other contestants. On the catwalk, the models must remain composed while avoiding being struck by swinging pendulums. Natalia is noted for her marked improvement on the runway, but it is Andre who impresses the judges the most and wins the challenge.

Challenge winner: Andre Whyte

Back at the house, the male contestants are waxed. At the shoot, the contestants are told that they will have pose nude. Those who refuse are given the option to work with 'partners' that won't be revealed until the session begins.

Karolina P. becomes agitated after several of the worms and millipedes she is posing with begin to crawl into her bra and underwear, with the rest having no issues. Samuel is given snakes to work with, causing a confrontation between him, Magda and Kamila, with the latter two pointing out his hypocrisy at having refused to wear the snake print earlier that week, but having no qualms about posing with a real snake. Natalia and Radek impress the most on set, while Jagoda makes a poor impression due to her crass attitude and lack of tact with the photographer.

Zo Nowak sits as the fifth judge at panel. Jakob, Magda, Natalia and Radek are all praised, but it is Radek who receives best photo. Jagoda and Ola land in the bottom two, and Jagoda is eliminated from the competition.

First call-out: Radek Pestka
Bottom two: Jagoda Judzińska & Ola Ławnik-Sadkowska
Eliminated: Jagoda Judzińska
Featured photographer: Piotr Domagała
Special guests: Zo Nowak
Guest judge: Zo Nowak

Episode 6
Original airdate: 

The contestants return home from the previous elimination, and several are surprised that Radek received best photo. The following morning, the models are visited by celebrity personal trainer Tomasz Oświęcinski for an vigorous exercise session. Natalia bails out halfway through the session, being lambasted by the trainer and several of the other contestants due to her laziness.

Later in the day, they are driven to a studio to meet with Michał Pirog for the challenge. Each of the models will have to pose with some of the contestants from the previous cycle, Marta, Michalina and Michał, to recreate a Bruno Banani campaign. Karolina P. is deemed to have done the best job, and is rewarded with a box full of Bruno Banani cosmetics and a voucher worth 2000zł.

Challenge winner: Karolina Pisarek	

The following day the models arrive at a prison and are asked to change into jumpsuits. They are quickly confronted by an aggressive cop and inmate, who are revealed to be actors Marcin Perchuć and Julia Pogrebinska, both of whom will help them master their acting skills for the next challenge. Each contestant is then asked to improvise a scene with one of the actors, with the most convincing contestant winning the challenge. Ola has some issues with the setting, being reminded of the time she spent in juvenile hall. Ultimately, Natalia and Andre are chosen as the winners. As their prize, both are granted the opportunity to receive a visit from their loved ones.

Challenge winners: Andre Whyte & Natalia Gulkowska	

For the photo shoot session the contestants are taken to a mansion where they are paired up to portray the throes of love and death. Ola has a hard time with her fatalistic attitude, as well as taking direction, while Natalia and Michael struggle to gel well together due to their heavy dislike for one another.

At panel, Marcin Perchuć sits as the fifth judge. Natalia and Michael are the first paired to be judged, and both receive praise from the judges. Natalia is deemed to have done better of the two, and is granted immunity. Karolina G. is told she outshone Sebastian in their photo, and is also given immunity. Kamila, Magda, Andre and Karolina P. are also declared immune, with the other six contestants facing elimination.

Immune from elimination: Andre Whyte, Kamila Ibrom, Karolina Gilon, Karolina Pisarek, Magda Stępień-Kolesnikow & Natalia Gulkowska

Jakob, Michael, Ola, Radek, Samuel and Sebastian have their photos evaluated more thoroughly. Samuel is criticized because of his anal attitude and lack of flexibility due to his religion. Michael is praised due to his improvement, while Radek is critiqued due to his lack of height and runway potential. Jakob is judged on his cockiness. Ola and Sebastian are critiqued for failing to improve and stand out. When the models are called back, Joanna announces that two people will be eliminated from the competition. The immune contestants are called first during elimination, with Natalia receiving the best photo overall. Jakob, Ola and Sebastian land together in the bottom three, and Jakob is saved due to the strength of his past performances.

First call-out: Natalia Gulkowska	
Bottom three: Jakob Kosel, Ola Ławnik-Sadkowska & Sebastian Zawiliński	 
Eliminated: Ola Ławnik-Sadkowska & Sebastian Zawiliński
Featured photographers: Adam Balcerek (Challenge) & Kajus Pyrz (photo shoot)
Special guests: Tomasz Oświęcinski, Marta Sędzicka, Michalina Strabel, Michał Baryza, Katarzyna Zapasnik, Marcin Perchuć & Julia Pogrebinska
Guest judge: Marcin Perchuć

Episode 7
Original airdate: 

Immune from elimination: Andre Whyte, Karolina Gilon, Magda Stępień-Kolesnikow, Natalia Gulkowska & Radek Pestka
Challenge winner: Magda Stępień-Kolesnikow
First call-out: Andre Whyte
Bottom two:  Michael Mikołajczuk & Samuel Kowalski
Eliminated: Michael Mikołajczuk 
Featured photographer: Robert Wolański
Special guests: Kasia Struss
Guest judge: Kasia Struss

Episode 8
Original airdate: 

Challenge winner: Magda Stępień-Kolesnikow	
First call-out: Magda Stępień-Kolesnikow & Jakob Kosel
Bottom two: Natalia Gulkowska & Radek Pestka 
Originally eliminated: Natalia Gulkowska 
Featured photographer: Alexander Lipkin
Guest judge: Ania Jurgaś

Episode 9
Original Airdate: 

Challenge winner: Karolina Gilon
Challenge winner: Karolina Pisarek 
First call-out:  Radek Pestka 
Bottom two: Magda Stępień-Kolesnikow & Natalia Gulkowska
Originally eliminated: Magda Stępień-Kolesnikow
Quit: Natalia Gulkowska

Episode 10
Original Airdate: 

Challenge winner: Karolina Pisarek
First call-out: Karolina Pisarek
Bottom three: Andre Whyte, Kamila Ibrom & Magda Stępień-Kolesnikow
Eliminated: Andre Whyte & Kamila Ibrom

Episode 11
Original Airdate: 

Challenge winner: Magda Stępień-Kolesnikow
First call-out: Karolina Pisarek
Bottom two: Radek Pestka & Samuel Kowalski
Eliminated: Samuel Kowalski

Episode 12
Original Airdate: 

Challenge winner: Karolina Gilon
First call-out: Jakob Kosel
Bottom three: Karolina Gilon, Magda Stępień-Kolesnikow & Radek Pestka
Eliminated: Karolina Gilon & Magda Stępień-Kolesnikow

Episode 13
Original Airdate: 

Final three: Jakob Kosel, Karolina Pisarek & Radek Pestka
Eliminated: Jakob Kosel
Final two: Karolina Pisarek & Radek Pestka
Poland's Next Top Model: Radek Pestka

Summaries

Call-out order

 The contestant was eliminated
 The contestant was immune from elimination
 The contestant was originally eliminated, but was saved
 The contestant quit the competition
 The contestant won the competition

Episodes 1, 2 and 3 were casting episodes. In episode 3, the pool of semi-finalists was reduced to the final 14 models who moved on to the main competition.
Episodes 6, 10 and 12 featured double eliminations with the bottom three contestants being in danger of elimination.
In episodes 6 and 7, the best-performing contestant from each photo shoot pair was deemed immune at panel. 
In episode 4, Joanna revealed that mentor Michał Pirog would be granted the opportunity to save one contestant from elimination at any point in the competition.
In episode 8, Magda and Jakob received best photo as a pair. Both were asked to decide who the better performing contestant was, agreeing it had been Magda. Natalia was originally eliminated when she landed in the bottom two with Radek, but Michał decided to save her from being eliminated.
In episode 9, Magda was originally eliminated when she landed in the bottom two with Natalia. When Natalia decided to quit, Magda was allowed to remain in the competition.

Bottom Two/Three 

 The contestant was eliminated after their first time in the bottom two
 The contestant was eliminated after their second time in the bottom two
 The contestant was eliminated after their third time in the bottom two
 The contestant quit the competition
 The contestant was eliminated in the final judging and placed third.
 The contestant was eliminated in the final judging and placed second.

Photo shoot guide
Episode 3 photo shoot: Lakeside group shots (semifinals)
Episode 4 photo shoot: 50s army fashion with parachutes
Episode 5 photo shoot: Own choice; naked or with insects
Episode 6 photo shoot: Love and death in pairs
Episode 7 photo shoot: Glamour sport editorial
Episode 8 photo shoot: Swimwear in pairs in the Dead Sea
Episode 9 photo shoot: Recreating childhood photos
Episode 10 photo shoot: Covered in powder and honey
Episode 11 photo shoot: Posing with monkeys in a mangrove swamp
Episode 12 photo shoot: Editorial in Cần Thơ's floating market
Episode 13 photo shoot:  Glamour magazine covers & spreads in Lanzarote

References

 

1
2015 Polish television seasons